Julie Mahoney (born 31 May 1978) is a Canadian fencer. She competed in the women's individual and team foil events at the 2000 Summer Olympics.

References

External links
 

1978 births
Living people
Canadian female fencers
Olympic fencers of Canada
Fencers at the 2000 Summer Olympics
Fencers from Montreal
Pan American Games medalists in fencing
Pan American Games bronze medalists for Canada
Fencers at the 1999 Pan American Games
Medalists at the 1999 Pan American Games
20th-century Canadian women